La Varsovienne may refer to:

 Warszawianka (1831), Polish patriotic song originally written in French as La Varsovienne
 Whirlwinds of Danger or Warszawianka (1905), Polish revolutionary song originally written in Polish, later popular in France as La Varsovienne

See also
 Varsovienne, Polish dance